The Hottentots Holland Mountains are part of the Cape Fold Belt in the Western Cape, South Africa. The mountain range forms a barrier between the Cape Town metropolitan area and the southern Overberg coast. 

The range is primarily composed of Table Mountain Sandstone, and lies between the eastern Cape Town suburbs of Somerset West and Gordon's Bay to the west, and the Elgin valley to the east. Sir Lowry's Pass is the only crossing, in the form of the N2 motorway. The Steenbras Dam, one of Cape Town's main supply dams, is located in the Elgin valley south of the town of Grabouw due to the abundant rainfall normally experienced in the uplands of the catchment area.

Pass
The Gantouw (Eland Pass) ceased to be used by wagons on the 6th July 1830, when the new Sir Lowry's Pass road was opened. Wagons of the Great Trek beginning 1835, did not actually use the old pass, instead they used the new road. When previous migrants decided to leave the Cape Town area, or Cape Colony as it was then known, this was the first mountain range they crossed. Cuts and wheel markings from their ox wagons can still be seen in rock formations of the old Gantouw pass which lies slightly north of the new Sir Lowry's Pass, and are a national monument. This route still serves as the primary route out of the Cape Town area for travellers heading east along the coast of South Africa.

Climate
The climate is typically Mediterranean, however it is generally much cooler and more verdant than other areas in the Western Cape, with annual precipitation exceeding 1500 mm (as high as 3300 mm on the Dwarsberg plateau) and summer temperature maxima rarely exceeding 25 °C. Snow is not unusual on the higher peaks, like Verkykerkop, Somerset Sneeukop at 1590 m high and The Triplets in the northern section of the range. This area and the other ranges to the south are considered the hub of the Cape floristic region with the most biodiversity in the entire fynbos biome. The surrounding lowlands have rich alluvial soils supporting viticulture and other deciduous fruit farms.

Peaks

Haelkop: 1,384m
Somerset-Sneeukop: 1,590m
Landrosnaald 1,346m
Pisgah 1,349m 
Sneeukopnaald 1285m
Landroskop1435m

Hottentots Holland Nature Reserve
The Hottentots Holland Nature Reserve is a World Heritage Site with an area of 70 000 hectares from Elgin to north of Villiersdorp, between the Stellenbosch Mountains and the Groenland mountains. The reserve functions as a conservation area for mountain fynbos, with about 1 300 plant species, of which some are rare and endemic. About 110 species of bird have been recorded, and a variety of indigenous animals, some of which have been reintroduced.

Altitude in the reserve varies from 500 m to 1 59 0m. Weather conditions can be unpredictable, and bad weather can make conditions dangerous. The entrance to the reserve is at Nuweberg, in Viljoen's Pass (R321) between Villiersdorp and Grabouw. An additional 7 000 hectares of state and privale land adjacent to the reserve is co-managed by the Theewaterskloof Conservancy, which includes CapeNature and private landowners.

References

Mountain ranges of the Western Cape
History of the Gantouw (Eland Pass) and the new Sir Lowry's Pass. S. Chadwick May 2021